150 - Ladysmith, KwaZulu-Natal
Alex - Alexandra, township to the northeast of Johannesburg
Arniston - Waenhuiskrans
Azania - South Africa, commonly used by polical activists and journalists, sometimes even in formal reference. During the transition to democracy there was a strong call to have South Africa’s name changed to Azania. 
Berg - Drakensberg mountains, subdivided into the Northern Berg, Central Berg and Southern Berg
The Fifth - Bloemfontein
B.town - Bloemhof
Border - The Eastern Cape area, near East London. This term also referred to the northern border of South West Africa (now Namibia)  in respect of the military operations during the South African Border War.
Die Bos - Stellenbosch (Also referred to as Eikestad or Stellies in the Afrikaans community.) 
Durbs, Thekwini ,eGagasini - Durban. The term '-gagasi' means 'wave' in Zulu (as in an ocean wave), rendering eGagasini as the place of the wave.
Deep North - The East Rand (as used in Durban)
Eastern Province - Eastern Cape
Eikestad - Stellenbosch (Also referred to as Bubbytown or Stellies in the Afrikaans community.) 
Free State - originally short for Orange Free State, now official name for Free State Province
Graafies - Graaff Reinet
The G-Spot, G-Vegas or G-Town - Grahamstown
Harties - Hartbeespoort; Blown as well as the large reservoir and dam located in a gap (poort) in the Magaliesberg mountains west of Pretoria
J-Bay - Jeffreys Bay
Jacaranda City, Jakarandastad - Pretoria, after the large numbers of jacaranda trees in the city.
Jo'burg, Johburg, Jozi,  Joeys, eGoli ,Gauteng Province, Gangsters Paradise  Johannesburg
Kaap, Cape - Cape Town.  As in "Ek gaan Kaap toe" (I am going to the Cape).  From the Afrikaans name for Cape Town, Kaapstad.  May also refer to the wider surrounding area.
Keurbooms - Keurboomstrand
King - King William's Town
Klerkies - Klerksdorp
Kowie - Port Alfred
Krugs - Kruger National Park
KZN - KwaZulu-Natal
Last town - Christiana
Maritzburg - Pietermaritzburg
Maftown - Mahikeng
Mas Vegas - Masvingo
Mzansi - South Africa (uMzantsi is Xhosa for 'south'). Invented by journalist/ editor Thami Masemola while working for the now-defunct South African youth publication Y magazine in 1999. Taken from the isiXhosa words 'Mzantsi Africa', meaning 'South Africa' but without the 't', hence the difference. 
Mother City - Cape Town
Moz - Mozambique
Nam - Namibia
PE, Baai - Port Elizabeth. "Ek gaan Baai toe" is Afrikaans for "I'm going to Port Elizabeth". From "Algoabaai" (Algoa Bay). In the north-western corner of South Africa, i.e. Namaqualand. Die Baai would refer to Alexander Bay.
Plett - Plettenberg Bay
PLK - Polokwane
Port - Port Nolloth, one of the two major coastal communities in Namaqualand, the other one being Die Baai which refers to Alexander Bay.
Potch - Potchefstroom
Potties - Potgietersrus
Pret - Pretoria
PTA - Pretoria
P-Town - Pretoria
PWV - Collective term for the three conurbations of Gauteng Province, i.e. Pretoria, Witwatersrand and Vereeniging. Also the original name of Gauteng Province.
Rand - Witwatersrand, referring to Johannesburg and all its contiguous towns on the Witwatersrand, located along a linear distance of approximately 80 km in central Gauteng.
RSA - Republic of South Africa
Rusty - Rustenburg
Sheppie - Port Shepstone, a seaside resort town in southern Kwa-Zulu Natal
Slummies, Slumtown - East London
Snor City - Pretoria, Snor is Afrikaans for mustache. 
Stellies - Stellenbosch, also referred to as Die Bos or Eikestad in the Afrikaans community.
TBVC states - Collective term for the homelands Transkei, Bophuthatswana, Venda and Ciskei under apartheid (now defunct)
Thaba - Thabazimbi
Toti, The Deep South or Amanzimtexas - Amanzimtoti, (resort town outside Durban)
Vaal - The Gauteng (formerly Transvaal) area around Vereeniging due to the Vaal River in the vicinity
V-Town - Vereeniging
Vuilbijl - Vanderbijlpark. Due to the serious air pollution predominantly caused by surrounding big industries. "Vuil" is the Afrikaans word for dirty.
Western Province - Western Cape
Wildtuin - Kruger National Park. "Ons gaan Julie Wildtuin toe" is Afrikaans for "We are visiting the Kruger National Park in July".  From the Afrikaans word for game park.
Wollies - Wolmaransstad
Zim - Zimbabwe (Zimbabweans call South Africa 'South' also 'Downsouth')
JTown - Jouberton
Benghazi - Khuma

South Africa, Colloquial
South Africa
Place names